Bowling events have been contested at every Asian Para Games since 2010 Asian Games in Guangzhou.

Editions

Medal table

References

External links
Asian Paralympic Committee

 
Sports at the Asian Para Games
Bowling at multi-sport events